Black Cowboys may refer to:

"Black Cowboys", a song by Bruce Springsteen on his 2005 album Devils & Dust
"Black Cowboys", a song by Jeru the Damaja on his 1996 album Wrath of the Math

See also
Black cowboys
New York City Federation of Black Cowboys